Pioprosopus is a genus of beetles in the family Carabidae, containing the following species:

 Pioprosopus aemulus Tschitscherine, 1902
 Pioprosopus bottoi Straneo, 1959
 Pioprosopus discrepans Tschitscherine, 1902
 Pioprosopus milloti Jeannel, 1948
 Pioprosopus morio Tschitscherine, 1899

References

Pterostichinae